Quelle may refer to:

People
 Horst Matthai Quelle (1912–1999), German philosopher
 Quelle Chris (born 1984), American rapper

Other
 Quelle (Bible), a collection of Jesus' sayings
 Quelle station, in Bielefeld, Germany
 Quelle-Kupferheide station, located in Bielefeld, Germany
 Quelle, a German department store now part of Karstadt
 Quelle AG, now part of Arcandor

See also
 

German toponymic surnames